Party of Democratic Socialism may refer to:

Party of Democratic Socialism (Czech Republic), founded 1997
Party of Democratic Socialism (Germany), 1989–2007
Party of Democratic Socialism (Greece), 1979–1989
Party of Democratic Socialism (India), founded 2001

See also
List of democratic socialist parties and organizations